Karen Annette Budge (born November 14, 1949) is a former World Cup alpine ski racer from the United States. She had three podium finishes and 30 top ten results in World Cup competitions between 1967 and 1972; overall her best result was 15th place in the 1969–70 season. At the 1972 Winter Olympics she placed 14th in the downhill and 23rd in the giant slalom events.

Born and raised in Jackson, Wyoming, Budge married Gordi Eaton, a former alpine ski racer and coach. They reside in Middlebury, Vermont and co-own a restaurant in Lincoln, New Hampshire, in the White Mountains near Loon Mountain and Cannon Mountain ski areas.

At the 1968 Winter Olympics in France, eighteen-year-old Budge was testing her wax on a practice course an hour before the women's downhill at Chamrousse, and narrowly avoided a full collision with a member of the Moroccan men's team, Said Housni, who had been warned once before to stay off the hill. She fell, suffered a dislocated shoulder, and did not start.

References

External links
 
 Karen Budge World Cup standings at the International Ski Federation
 
 
 Intermountain Ski Hall of Fame – inducted 2012 – Karen Budge-Eaton

1949 births
Living people
American female alpine skiers
Olympic alpine skiers of the United States
Alpine skiers at the 1968 Winter Olympics
Alpine skiers at the 1972 Winter Olympics
People from Middlebury, Vermont
21st-century American women